Mokri Dolac Stadium is a multi-purpose stadium in Posušje, Bosnia and Herzegovina.  It is currently used mostly for football matches and is the home ground of HŠK Posušje. The stadium has a capacity of 8,000.

References

External links

Football venues in Bosnia and Herzegovina
Posušje
Multi-purpose stadiums in Bosnia and Herzegovina